Alfred Leiser (born 6 March 1929) is a Swiss racewalker. He competed in the men's 50 kilometres walk at the 1960 Summer Olympics.

References

External links
 

1929 births
Living people
Athletes (track and field) at the 1960 Summer Olympics
Swiss male racewalkers
Olympic athletes of Switzerland
Sportspeople from Zürich